Sainte-Marie-la-Robert is a commune in the Orne department in north-western France. As of 2017, the commune had a population of 85 inhabitants.

Politics and administration 
Sainte-Marie-la-Robert is governed by a conseil municipal composed of seven members, consisting of both a mayor and deputy mayor.

See also
Communes of the Orne department
Parc naturel régional Normandie-Maine

References

Saintemarielarobert